= Matua Banglara =

- Town
- Location within Pakistan
- Coordinates: 33.16°N 73.19°E
- Country: Pakistan
- Province: Islamabad C.T
- Elevation: 442 m (1,450 ft)
- Time zone: UTC+5 (PST)

Matua Banglara is a town in the Islamabad Capital Territory of Pakistan. It is located at 33° 16' 45N 73° 19' 25E with an altitude of 442 metres (1453 feet).
